Yandeyarra (also referred to as Mugarinya) is a large Aboriginal community, located in the Pilbara region of Western Australia, within the Town of Port Hedland.

History 
Yandeyarra was established in 1964 and has a population of approximately 400 people. The community is located within the Yandeyarra pastoral station. The original buildings on the site formed an outstation of the original pastoral station.

In January 2019, over 1,000 cattle died on Yandeyarra Reserve, including 760 which were euthanised after being found in poor health. The Mugarinya Community Association Inc. and eight associated individuals were charged with multiple counts of animal cruelty in January 2021.

Native title 
The community is located within the registered Kariyarra people (WAD6169/1998) native title claim area.

Education 
Children of school age at Yandeyarra attend the Yandeyarra Remote Community School. The school caters for years K – 12 with approximately 40 students enrolled.

Town planning 
Yandeyarra Layout Plan No.1 has been prepared in accordance with State Planning Policy 3.2 Aboriginal Settlements. Layout Plan No.1 was endorsed by the community on 6 July 2001 and the Western Australian Planning Commission on 1 August 2001.

References

External links
 Native Title Claimant application summary

Towns in Western Australia
Aboriginal communities in Pilbara